Huernia zebrina, the little owl, is a species of flowering plant in the family Apocynaceae, native to Namibia, Botswana, northern South Africa, Zimbabwe, and Mozambique. A succulent, it has gained the Royal Horticultural Society's Award of Garden Merit.

Subtaxa
The following subspecies are accepted:
Huernia zebrina subsp. insigniflora (C.A.Maass) Bruyns
Huernia zebrina subsp. zebrina

References

zebrina
Succulent plants
Flora of Southern Africa
Flora of Mozambique
Plants described in 1909
Taxa named by N. E. Brown